Miss Teen USA 1985, the 3rd Miss Teen USA pageant, was televised live from the James L. Knight International Center Arena in Miami, Florida on 22 January 1985. At the conclusion of the final competition, Kelly Hu of Hawaii was crowned by outgoing queen  Cherise Haugen of Illinois.

Results

Placements

Special awards

Final competition scores

     Winner 
     First runner-up
     Second runner-up 
     Third runner-up
     Fourth runner-up

Historical significance 
 Hawaii wins competition for the first time. Also becoming in the 3rd state who wins Miss Teen USA.
 Wyoming earns the 1st runner-up position for the first time. 
 Washington earns the 2nd runner-up position for the first time.
 Texas earns the 3rd runner-up position for the first time.
 Missouri earns the 4th runner-up position for the first time. 
 States that placed in semifinals the previous year were Hawaii, Illinois, North Carolina, North Dakota and Texas. 
 Texas placed for the third consecutive year. 
 Hawaii, Illinois, North Carolina and North Dakota made their second consecutive placement.
 Arkansas, Georgia and Washington last placed in 1983.
 Missouri placed for the first time.
 Wyoming placed for the first time.

Judges
Ken Swofford
Cathy Rigby McCoy
Christian LeBlanc
Ruth Zakarian - Miss Teen USA 1983 from New York
Rowdy Gaines
Lindsay Bloom
Eric Van Lustbader
Krista Tesreau
Mayf Nutter
Rebe Jackson
Frank Bonner

Delegates
The Miss Teen USA 1985 delegates were:

 Alabama - Teresa King
 Alaska - Debbie Essin
 Arizona - Vanessa Stetson
 Arkansas - Rhonda Heird
 California - Sharon Gunther
 Colorado - Debbie James
 Connecticut - Kris Kunst
 Delaware - Julie Weasley
 District of Columbia - Meisha Hayes
 Florida - Erin Townsend
 Georgia - Meredith Brown
 Hawaii - Kelly Hu
 Idaho - Tracey Shirley
 Illinois - Lisa Jessen
 Indiana - Diana Ballard
 Iowa - Alisha Black
 Kansas - Tammy Lampton
 Kentucky - Leanne Gregory
 Louisiana - Julie Semika
 Maine - Tracy Smith
 Maryland - Lynn Bogardus
 Massachusetts - Maria Ingles
 Michigan - Tracey Shaw
 Minnesota - Lana Burke
 Mississippi - Chelle Wilson
 Missouri - Rhonda Hoglan
 Montana - Katie Adams
 Nebraska - Tina Farber
 Nevada - Leslie Peterson
 New Hampshire - Katherine Borski
 New Jersey - Sharon Turner
 New Mexico - Teresa Rodriguez
 New York -  Shelley Lown
 North Carolina - Kimberly Jordan
 North Dakota - Jill Hutchinson
 Ohio - Meg Scranton
 Oklahoma - Julie Khourey
 Oregon - Olga Calderon
 Pennsylvania - Kari Bernowski
 Rhode Island -  Chris Pavalli
 South Carolina - Jennifer Neuen
 South Dakota - Sarah Bergraft
 Tennessee - Tammy Woods
 Texas - Konae Wehle
 Utah - Susan Nelson
 Vermont - Wanda Minard
 Virginia - Alice Robinson
 Washington - Dru Homer
 West Virginia - Kelly Porterfield - Best State Costume Winner
 Wisconsin - Maria Kim
 Wyoming - Emily Ernst

Contestant notes
In 1993 Kelly Hu became the first Miss Teen USA winner to win a Miss USA state pageant.  As Miss Hawaii USA she competed in the Miss USA 1993 pageant, making the finals and finishing 4th (3rd runner up, top 6 finalist), and winning the Miss Photogenic award.
Other delegates who later competed in the Miss USA pageant were:
Debbie James (Colorado) - Miss Colorado USA 1989 (Top 10 Semifinalist at Miss USA 1989)
Rhonda Hoglan (Missouri) - Miss Missouri USA 1989
Julie Khourey (Oklahoma) - Miss Oklahoma USA 1991 (Top 6 Finalist at Miss USA 1991)
Olga Calderon (Oregon) - Miss Oregon USA 1991 (Semi-finalist at Miss USA 1991)
Two contestants later competed in the Miss America pageant: Maria Kim (Wisconsin) who was Miss Wisconsin 1987, and Teresa Rodriguez (New Mexico) who was Miss New Mexico 1988

References

1985
1985 in Florida
1985 beauty pageants